Onochie Lawrence ("Larry") Achike (born 31 January 1975) is a retired English track and field athlete. He was born in Islington, London, and educated at Worth School in Sussex.

Athletics career
A former rugby player, Achike eventually specialized in triple jump and represented England, winning the gold medal at the 1998 Commonwealth Games. He placed 5th in the 2000 Olympic Games, setting a new personal best of 17.30 m during the contest.He competed at the 2006 European Championships, but failed to qualify for the final. His club is Shaftesbury Barnet Harriers in North London. Achike finished 7th in the 2008 Olympics, held in Beijing, with a 17.17 m jump.

International competitions

Family
Olivia Achike, Sarah Achike, Ella Achike, Ruben Ackike.

References

1975 births
Living people
People from Islington (district)
Athletes from London
English male triple jumpers
British male triple jumpers
Olympic male triple jumpers
Olympic athletes of Great Britain
Athletes (track and field) at the 2000 Summer Olympics
Athletes (track and field) at the 2008 Summer Olympics
Commonwealth Games gold medallists for England
Commonwealth Games medallists in athletics
Athletes (track and field) at the 1998 Commonwealth Games
Athletes (track and field) at the 2010 Commonwealth Games
Competitors at the 2001 Goodwill Games
World Athletics Championships athletes for Great Britain
World Athletics U20 Championships winners
British Athletics Championships winners
Australian Athletics Championships winners
People educated at Worth School
Medallists at the 1998 Commonwealth Games